Farewell Bend State Recreation Area is a state park in Baker County, Oregon, United States, about  northwest of Ontario.  Farewell Bend was the last stop on the Oregon Trail along the Snake River where travelers could rest and water and graze their animals before the trail turned north through more rugged country to follow the Burnt River.

References

External links 
 

State parks of Oregon
Parks in Baker County, Oregon
Oregon Trail
Snake River